1770 Naval Air Squadron (1770 NAS) was a Naval Air Squadron of the Royal Navy's Fleet Air Arm. It formed at RNAS Yeovilton (HMS Heron) on 10 September 1943 as a two-seat fighter squadron and embarked on HMS Indefatigable in May 1944. It took part in several attacks on the German Battleship Tirpitz and other operations in Norwegian waters before sailing for the Far East. In 1945, as part of the British Pacific Fleet, the squadron took part in attacks on Sumatra, Sakishima Gunto and Formosa. It disembarked to Australia in June 1945 and then disbanded on 30 September 1945 at RAAF Maryborough (HMS Nabstock).

Aircraft flown
1770 Naval Air Squadron flew only one aircraft type:

Fairey Firefly

References

Citations

Bibliography

External links
 Squadron memoir, 1945

1700 series Fleet Air Arm squadrons
Military units and formations established in 1943